Fotis Tefos Perlikos (born 1979) was the president of Liberal Alliance, a small political party in Greece formed in 2007.

Biography 
Perlikos was born in Piraeus, Greece.  He has lived in Profitou Ilia, Nea Smirni, Paleo Faliro, and Kallithea, all areas of Athens, Greece. He studied medicine and is now employed as a medical doctor in Sotiria Hospital. He claims to be a normal everyday citizen, not a professional politician, and not rich.

Political views 
According to his writings, he started his exploration in more-or-less left-oriented politics. He later denounced leftism and subscribed to the ideal of individual freedom. He learnt about libertarianism and liberalism from the Internet.

In his writings he refers to Ayn Rand.

Organisations 
In 2004 he was associated with the organisation Diktyo Eleftherias (Liberty Network). He was president of Liberal Alliance.

Interviews 
The following media organisations have published or broadcast interviews of Fotis Perlikos:
 ET1
 Alpha Radio
 Skai
 Athina 984
ANT1
Star
ALPHA
NET

References

External links 
 Homepage

1978 births
Living people
Greek politicians
Politicians from Piraeus